Will O' the Wisp is the sixth studio album by Leon Russell. The album was released in 1975 on Shelter Records. It peaked at No. 30 on the Billboard albums chart and remained on the chart for 40 weeks. The album cover was designed and illustrated by artist/actor Gailard Sartain.

It features the hit single, "Lady Blue", which reached No. 14 on the Billboard Hot 100 singles chart. The album was certified gold in 1976.

On July 21, 1999, Leon performed "Back to the Island" live on The David Letterman Show.

Track listing 

All tracks composed by Leon Russell

Side one
 "Will O' the Wisp" (instrumental) – 0:55
 "Little Hideaway" – 3:57
 "Make You Feel Good" – 2:23
 "Can't Get Over Losing You" – 5:04
 "My Father's Shoes" – 4:16
 "Stay Away from Sad Songs" – 4:01

Side Two
 "Back to the Island" – 5:20
 "Down on Deep River" – 3:55
 "Blue Bird" – 3:55
 "Laying Right Here in Heaven" – 2:52
 "Lady Blue" – 3:28

Charts

Personnel 
Leon Russell – vocals, bass guitar, acoustic guitar, piano, synthesizer, clavinet, percussion
Steve Cropper, Bobby Manuel, J. J. Cale, Tommy Allsup, Don Preston – guitar
Donald Dunn, Carl Radle – bass guitar
Patrick Henderson – organ
Teddy Jack Eddy, Richard "Moon" Calhoun, Al Jackson Jr., Ambrose Adekoya Campbell, Jim Keltner, Carl Himmel – drums
Mary McCreary – background vocals
Jim Horn – alto saxophone
Masako Hirayama – biwa
Minoru Muraoka – flute
Roger Linn – synthesizer, programming

References 

1975 albums
Leon Russell albums
Albums produced by Denny Cordell
Albums produced by Leon Russell
Shelter Records albums